Pettit may refer to:

Places
Pettit (lunar crater)
Pettit (Martian crater), on Mars
Pettit, California, former name of Pettit Place, California
Pettit, Indiana
Pettit, Kentucky
Pettit, New South Wales
Pettit, Oklahoma
Pettit Creek, a creek in Bartow County, Georgia
Pettit Lake, a large alpine lake in Blaine County, Idaho, United States
Pettit Barracks, in Zamboanga City (Mindanao, the Philippines)
Pettit Memorial Chapel, Frank Lloyd Wright building
Pettit National Ice Center, in West Allis, Wisconsin
Roberto L. Pettit (Asunción), a neighbourhood (barrio) of Asunción, Paraguay
Claude W. Pettit College of Law, a private, non-profit law school located in Ada, Ohio, United States

Ships
, Edsall-class destroyer escort
, U.S. Navy Civil War tugboat

People
Pettit (surname), people with this name

See also
Petit (disambiguation)
Pettitt (surname)
 Andy Pettitte (1972– ), American baseball player